Elmira Shahtakhtinskaya (25 October 1930 – 13 October 1996) was a painter, Honored Art Worker of the Azerbaijan SSR, and the People's Artist of the Azerbaijan SSR.

Biography
Elmira Shahtakhtinskaya was born on October 25, 1930, in Baku. Her first education was in Baku. Then she graduated from Painting School named after Azim Azimzade in 1950. Later she studied at Surikov Moscow Art Institute in 1951–1956. Her thesis was the poster "40 years of October". She returned to Azerbaijan, lived and worked in Baku.

Elmira Shahtakhtinskaya achieved a success while working in the portrait genre. Among the famous portrait works of the artist the art figures are more remarkable as "Muslim Magomayev", "Huseyn Javid", "Arif Malikov", "Fikret Amirov", "Uzeyir Hajibeyov", "Sattar Bahlulzade" and others.

In 1963, she was awarded the title of Honored Art Worker of the Azerbaijan SSR and in 1977, she was awarded the title of People's Artist of the Azerbaijan SSR.

In the late 1980s, she began to paint more landscapes. She painted landscapes not only of her native land (Baku, Zaqatala District), but also of Moscow Region, the Black Sea, London, Prague, Stockholm, etc.
Among her most famous paintings of this genre, it is worth noting “The Old Tree”, “In the Old Shagan”, “Shusha-Isabulag”, “In the Pir-Gulu Forest”, “On the Bank of Bilgia”, “Rocks”, “Ancient Fortress”, “ Mountains near Sheki".

In the 1970s, the poster series "Azerbaijan is a land of ancient culture", a gallery of portraits of Azerbaijani scientists, literary and art figures, machine tools and "In Czechoslovakia" (1957), "The Socialist Baku" series (1958-1959), "Bulgaria" (1963), and "Novruz Holiday" (1970) watercolors were created by the artist. Her personal exhibitions were demonstrated in Moscow (1957), Kaunas (1967), Baku (1967, 1989), Nakhchivan (city) (1979). Elmira Shahtakhtinskaya was awarded the "Order of Honor".

The artist died on October 13, 1996, in Moscow and was buried in the Alley of Honor in Baku. The documentary movie about the artist "Elmira Shahtakhtinskaya" was filmed in 2010.

References

1930 births
1996 deaths
20th-century Azerbaijani women artists
20th-century Azerbaijani painters
Azerbaijani painters
Azerbaijani women painters
Soviet women artists
Soviet artists
Artists from Baku
Portrait painters
People's Artists of Azerbaijan
Burials at II Alley of Honor